Wagon wheel may refer to:

Transport
 The wheel of a wagon, made by a wheelwright.

Business
 Wagon Wheels, a brand of biscuits in the United Kingdom, Canada, and Australia
 Wagon Wheel, Oxnard, California, a motel and restaurant (now demolished) on U.S. Route 101
 Wagon Wheel Motel, Café and Station on U.S. Route 66 in Cuba, Missouri
 Wagon Wheel, Rancho Santa Margarita, California, a master-planned community

Music
 "Wagon Wheel" (2004), written by Bob Dylan and Ketch Secor and recorded by Old Crow Medicine Show, Darius Rucker and Nathan Carter
 "Wagon Wheel", a song on Lou Reed's 1972 album Transformer
 "Wagon Wheels", a classic American Western song circa 1930
 Wagon Wheel (album)

Places
 Wagon Wheel, Arizona, an unincorporated community
 Wagon Wheel, New Mexico, an unincorporated community
 Wagon Wheel, a neighborhood in the city of Oxnard, California

Others
 Wagon Wheel (trophy), a trophy awarded to the winner of a football game between the University of Akron and Kent State University
 Wagon-wheel effect, the perception of a spinning object under a strobe light or on film
 Wagon wheel, a chart used in cricket showing where a batsman hit the ball
 Wagon wheel, an alternate name for the Rotelle pasta
 The Wagon Wheel Theatre, a venue in Warsaw, Indiana
 Wagon Wheels (film) a 1934 Western starring Randolph Scott